Brad Greenquist (born October 8, 1959) is an American actor.

Career
Greenquist appeared in Pet Sematary, the 1989 film adaptation of Stephen King's 1983 novel of the same name, and in films such as The Diary of Ellen Rimbauer. From the 1990s he was seen as a guest star in various American television series, such as Charmed and ER.

Greenquist was director Steven Soderbergh's preferred choice for the role of Graham Dalton in Sex, Lies, and Videotape, after Kyle MacLachlan and Aidan Quinn turned down the role. However, the producers wanted a more well-known actor, so Soderbergh cast James Spader instead.

Greenquist is also known for his four appearances on various iterations of Star Trek. On Star Trek: Voyager, Greenquist appeared in the Season 3 episode "Warlord." He played the thief Krit in the Star Trek: Deep Space Nine sixth season episode "Who Mourns for Morn?" He also appeared in two separate Star Trek: Enterprise episodes. In the second season episode "Dawn," he played Khata'n Zshaar, and then in the fourth season, he played an unnamed Rigelian kidnapper. Because of these appearances, as well as others in science fiction, fantasy, and horror themed movies and television shows, Greenquist frequently appears on the convention circuit.

Filmography

Film
Mutants in Paradise (1984): Steve Awesome 
The Bedroom Window (1987): Carl Henderson
The Chair (1989): 'Mushmouth'
Pet Sematary (1989): Victor Pascow
Loose Cannons (1990): Embassy Officer 
Gang Related (1997): Assistant District Attorney Richard Stein
Inherit the Wind (1999): Tom Davenport
The Puzzle in the Air (1999): Jeff Swerdling
Crime and Punishment in Suburbia (2000): Calvin Berry
Lost Souls (2000): George Viznik
Ali (2001): Marlin Thomas
Outside the Law (2002, direct-to-video): Agent McKenzie
The Diary of Ellen Rimbauer (2003, made-for-TV): Doug Posey
Momentum (2003, made-for-TV): Martin Elias 
Shiloh Falls (2007): Dalton
Across the Hall (2009): The Porter
The Cursed (2010): Fred Belmont
Water for Elephants (2011): Mr. Robinson
California Solo (2012): Piper
The Lone Ranger (2013): Shareholder 
The Trials of Cate McCall (2013): Dr. Ennis
Reality (2014): Jacques
Annabelle: Creation (2017): Victor Palmeri
Now Is Everything (2019): Detective

Video games
The Beast Within: A Gabriel Knight Mystery (1995): Georg Immerding 
Wing Commander: Prophecy (1997): Major Karl 'Spyder' Bowen

References

External links
 

1959 births
Living people
American male film actors
American male television actors
American male video game actors
20th-century American male actors
21st-century American male actors